Buffy is a pet form of the female given name Elizabeth.

Buffy or Buffie may also refer to:

People

Given name
 Buffie Carruth (born 1977), American model and fitness instructor
 Buffy Tyler (born 1978), Playboy playmate
 Buffy Wicks (born 1977), California State Assemblymember

Nickname
 Elizabeth Bowes-Lyon (1900–2002), the queen consort of Great Britain, who had the nickname Buffy as a child
 Darren Robinson (rapper) (1967–1995), also called Buffy, a member of the rap trio The Fat Boys
 Buffy Sainte-Marie (born 1941), indigenous Canadian-American musician, artist, and activist
 Dorothy Buffum Chandler (1901–1997), a Los Angeles cultural leader, was nicknamed Buffy or Buffie or Buff
 Elizabeth Williams (Rhondda politician) (born 1976), Welsh politician and Member of the Senedd, known as Buffy

Stage name
 Buffy (rapper) (born Kim Ju-hyeon, 1995) member of South Korean band MADTOWN

Fictional characters
 Buffy Summers, the title character in the 1997 TV series Buffy the Vampire Slayer
 Buffy Driscoll, a main character and Andi's best friend on Disney Channel's Andi Mack
 Buffy Gilmore, a main character in Scary Movie
 Buffy, the sister-in-law of Mike Motley in the 1976–2000 comic strip Motley's Crew
 Buffy Patterson Davis, the twin sister to Jody on the 1966 TV series Family Affair

Other uses
 Buffy (album), a 1974 album by Buffy Sainte-Marie for MCA Records
 Buffy (color), a color often used in description of birds
 Buffy (dog), Russian President Vladimir Putin's dog
 Buffy coat, a component of blood
 The Buffy EP, 1999 EP by Velvet Chain
 , trans-Neptunian object, nicknamed Buffy

See also
 Buffy the Vampire Slayer (disambiguation), various media and the character